Irlam Town F.C. was a football club from Irlam, Greater Manchester.

History

Irlam Town competed in the FA Vase in the 1976–77 season and joined the Cheshire County League Division Two in 1978, and after finishing third in the 1981–82 season the club was successful in gaining promotion to the North West Counties Football League Division Two via application. This followed a run in the FA Vase where they reached the Fifth Round before being knocked out by Willenhall Town. Irlam Town was promoted to NWCFL Division One after finishing runners up in the 1984–85 season. After two season in this division, during which they made their debut in the FA Cup, the club was moved up to the Northern Premier League Division One, becoming a founding member. However, the club never had any success at this level and were relegated down two leagues in the 1991–92 season back to the NWCFL Division Two. After three seasons near the bottom of the league the club folded.

Honours
North West Counties Football League Division Two
Runners-up 1984–85

Records
FA Cup
Second Qualifying Round 1987–88, 1990–91
FA Vase
Fifth Round 1981–82
Highest league position
13th, Northern Premier League Division One 1987–88

References

Defunct football clubs in England
North West Counties Football League clubs
Northern Premier League clubs
Football clubs in Salford
Defunct football clubs in Greater Manchester
Association football clubs disestablished in 1995
Cheshire County League clubs